Kerala Varma Pazhassi Raja  is a 2009 Indian Malayalam-language epic period drama film based on the life of Pazhassi Raja, a king who fought against the East India Company in the 18th century. The film was directed by Hariharan, written by M. T. Vasudevan Nair and produced by Gokulam Gopalan. It stars Mammootty in lead role with an ensemble supporting cast. The music score and soundtrack were created by Ilaiyaraaja, while its sound design is by Resul Pookutty. 

The film won National Film Award for Best Feature Film in Malayalam, Best Background Score, Best Audiography and Special Mention (for Padmapriya). It received numerous other accolades, including eight Kerala State Film Awards and seven Filmfare Awards South.

Pazhassi Raja was produced at a cost of 20 crore, making it the expensive film made in Malayalam until then. It is the first Malayalam film to get a home video release in Blu-ray format. Originally filmed in Malayalam, Pazhassi Raja was dubbed in Tamil as well as Hindi. The film released on 16 October 2009 across Kerala with 150 prints;  it ran for 150 days in theatres and was the highest-grossing film in Malayalam cinema until 2013 when the record was broken by Drishyam. It is often regarded as a classic in Malayalam cinema. The film received an overwhelming response and it has emerged as one of the top grossers in Kerala's box office history.

Plot 
The film starts in 1796, four years after the occupation of Malabar by the East India Company and towards the end of the First Pazhassi Revolt (1793–1797). The revolt is led by Kerala Varma, the Raja of Pazhassi Palace, of Kottayam house. The exploitation of the native Indian resources by the company had culminated in popular revolts against its authority across the district. With the help of Kerala Varma Pazhassi Raja's uncle Kurumbranadu ruler Veeravarma, who is jealous of Pazhassi Raja for his success and influence, and Raja's old companion Pazhayamveedan Chandhu, the Company act against Pazhassi Raja. This forces Pazhassi Raja to escape to the forests of Wayanad. The tribal force led by Neeli captures Assistant Collector Thomas Hervey Baber and his fiancée Dora  in the jungle, in spite of his commander's objection. The Raja treats Thomas Baber and Dora as his guest and releases them.

From there, he begins a guerrilla battles against the company. He is supported by his army chief Edachena Kunkan and his brother-in-law Kaitheri Ambu. In the guerrilla battle-front, Pazhassi Raja uses the expertise of Thalakkal Chandu, a Kurichya soldier, and Chandu's fiancée Neeli.

During the initial phases of the battle, the Company loses many men and much money. This compels them to make a peace treaty with Pazhassi Raja. Raja agrees, hoping that this move will bring peace to the area and his people. However, the conditions of the treaty are never observed by the company. This prompts Raja to start the battle again. Similarly, Dora leaves Thomas Baber for England, having learned the betrayal done by the company to the Raja and despite her objection to the hanging of a father and son, who refused to reveal the location of the Raja to the company. He forms useful alliances with many rulers and powerful families in the nearby places like Unni Mootha and his men.

Pazhassi Raja and his army successfully restart the battle. But the Company use heavily armed forces against him and succeed in luring many tribal leaders. This leads to the capture and subsequent hanging of Thalakkal Chandu as he was cheated by a tribal head.

The Company started hunting for Pazhassi and his army chief Edachena Kunkan. In a bloody fight, Edachena Kunkan kills Pazhayamveedan Chandhu. But he is surrounded by the company. Instead of surrendering before them, he commits suicide. This makes Raja's army weaker. But Pazhassi Raja, even though knowing that he is going to die, goes for a last fight against the company. After a glorious fight, Pazhassi Raja is killed by the company. The film ends with the assistant collector Thomas Baber placing the body of the Raja in a litter and his famous words: "He was our enemy. But he was a great warrior, a great man and we honour him." The Company officers respond by saluting the corpse of the Raja and acting as Pall-bearers.

Cast 

 Mammootty as Pazhassi Raja
 Sarathkumar as Edachena Kunkan Nair
 Manoj K. Jayan as Thalakkal Chandu
 Suresh Krishna as Kaitheri Ambu
 Suman as Pazhayamviden Chandu
 Kanika Subramaniam as Kaitheri Makkam
 Padmapriya Janakiraman as Neeli
 Jagathy Sreekumar as Kanara Menon
 Thilakan as Kurumbranaadu Raja Veera Varma
 Harry Key as Thomas Hervey Baber, Assistant Collector
 Linda Arsenio as Dora Baber
 Devan as Kannavathu Nambiar
 Lalu Alex as Emman Nair
 Captain Raju as Unni Mootha
 Jagadish as Bhandari
 Nedumudi Venu as Mooppan
 Mamukkoya as Athan Gurukkal
 Murali Mohan as Chirakkal Raja
 Ajay Rathnam as Subedar Cheran
 Susheel Kumar as Shekharan Warrier
 Urmila Unni as Chirakkal Thamburatty
 Valsala Menon as Kaitheri Thamburatty
 Yamini as Unniamma
 Abu Salim as Kunjambu, Malayali Soldier of British army
 Meghanathan as Vikraman, Malayali Soldier of British army
 Subair as Panicker, Malayali Soldier of British army
 Jayan Cherthala as Panikkasseri Kumaran Nambiar
 Peter Handley Evans as Major Robert Gordon
 Ross Elliot as Colonel James Bowles
 Tommy Donelly as Governor Jonathan Duncan
 Robin Pratt as Lieutenant Maxwell
Simon Hewitt as Captain Dickinson
 Gary Richardson as Major Clapham
 Glen David Short as Major Murray 
 J. Brandon Hill as Major Stephen

Production

Development
In an interview with Sify in January 2007, Hariharan said: "We had first toyed with the idea of a film on Payyampalli Chanthu, a warrior, and then we thought of making a film on Thalakkal Chanthu, Pazhassi Raja's lieutenant, as the hero. But eventually we realized that it was the story of Pazhassi himself that needed to be told, in a new light. In this film, we would be focussing on his valiant fight against the British.”

M. T. Vasudevan Nair, Hariharan, and Mammootty were working together after two decades; their previous association was Oru Vadakkan Veeragatha, which turned out into a landmark film in Malayalam. It was about Chanthu, a legendary warrior in the Northern Ballads. Through Pazhassi Raja, they made another biopic, on the life of Pazhassi Raja. Gokulam Gopalan was the film's producer. The total budget of the film is about  20 crores, which makes it the most expensive Malayalam film ever made. The sounds in the battle scenes of the film were recreated under Academy Award winner Resul Pookutty as he joined in the project only after its completion.

The Kerala High Court ordered the producers of the film to avail the benefit of entertainment tax concession for viewers of Pazhassi Raja.

Casting 
Mammootty plays the title role of Pazhassi Raja. The female lead was offered to former Malayalam film actress, Samyuktha Varma but she refused the offer. There are three heroines: Padmapriya appearing as a tribal girl, Kanika as Pazhassi's wife and Linda Arsenio as Dora Baber, fiancée of Assistant Collector Thomas Baber. Linda is a theatre artist in New York who also acted in the film Kabul Express.

Through this film, Sarath Kumar makes his debut in Malayalam cinema. He portrays Edachena Kunkan, the chief lieutenant to Pazhashi Raja. Suresh Gopi was originally cast for the role. However, he refused to accept. Later, he clarified that he couldn't act in the film due to personal reasons, and it would always be a loss for him. Suman portrayed Pazhayamveedan Chandu which marked his acting debut in Malayalam. Biju Menon was originally cast for the role, but he opted out after a few days of shooting, citing physical difficulties in shooting fight scenes.

Filming
The filming began in February 2007 from Palakkad. The filming lasted for two and a half years and was completed in August 2009. Sound mixer Resul Pookutty recreated all location scenes to ensure perfection. About the delay in making, Hariharan said: "The film's shoot took two years to complete, when it should have been completed in eight months. The delay was not because of me. Neither was it because my producer, Gokulam Gopalan, was short of money; I must really thank my producer, without whom a film like Pazhassi Raja would never have been made. The delay was because some of the stars were not willing to allot the extra time that was required for the film. They probably didn't realise this film would become a milestone in their careers. Making Pazhassi Raja was a great challenge for me. Directing Oru Vadakkan Veeragatha was a cakewalk, compared to this.".

Deleted scene
One of the fight sequence in the film (between Mammootty and Suman) had been deleted from the movie due to over duration. The scene was removed from the theatres in
the first week and again added after 75 days. However, this scene was excluded in television broadcast from Disney+Hotstar and other digital prints. Audience were not satisfied on this as they liked the fight sequence very much.

Music

The film features six original songs composed by Ilaiyaraaja. The original background score was composed by Ilaiyaraaja, conducted by László Kovács and performed by the Hungarian National Philharmonic Orchestra in Budapest. It took three months for Ilaiyaraaja to complete the background score. On 25 September, Think Music released a soundtrack album, featuring only the songs. The songs received mixed to negative critical reviews and "did not go the way that it was expected". Following the setback of the soundtrack album, Ilaiyaraaja stated that he was not satisfied with the lyrics of the poet O. N. V. Kurup, who penned two songs for the film. Ilaiyaraaja won the National Film Award for Best Background Score

Track listing
 Original version

Tamil version (Dubbed)

Hindi version (Dubbed)

Release
The film was released on 16 October as a Diwali release with 130 prints in the original Malayalam version and later on 17 November with 150 prints in Tamil. Later, on 27 September 2013, Goldmines Telefilms launched the trailer of the Hindi dubbed version of the film, at their YouTube channel. The full Hindi version of the film was digitally released on YouTube on 11 October 2013.

Home video
Moser Baer Home Entertainment released the film on Blu-ray Disc, DVD, SuperDVD and VCD in India. The home video rights was bought by Moser Baer for a record sum of  62 lakhs. Pazhassi Raja was the first regional language film to be released in the Blu-ray format. The DVD version of the film was released on 1 May 2010 as a two-DVD set. Film was screened in HBO internationally as per the reports of Siju Krishnan, a famous Mammootty fan. It was the only instance that a Malayalam film got screened in HBO. It is available in 16:9 Anamorphic widescreen, Dolby Digital 5.1 Surround, progressive 24 FPS, widescreen and NTSC format.

Reception

Critical response 
Nowrunning comments that the film is an "exotic chronicle that stuns us with its fascinating tale", and that "this is the stuff that tours de force are made of". Rediff gave the film 3.5 stars out of 5, praising the script and the technical brilliance of the film. Sify described the film as one "that will be treasured for years to come".

However, Rediff also stated that "sentimentalism bogs down the pace [of the film]" at several occasions of the story. Ilayaraja's music also received criticism, and the critics further accused the film of taking some cinematic liberties on history. The Hindu said, "the host of people who play English Lords and East India Company chiefs appears theatrical. Even Linda Arsenio, the English Lady Dora Baber, isn't spontaneous" and "while on editing, certain parts seem to have been trimmed in haste and hence hang without relevance. Strangely, despite an action-oriented story and mind-boggling stunts, the film sags at points." Other critics pointed the sloppy fight scenes and the English accent of Padmapriya who has dubbed for herself in the film.

Box office
Kerala Varma Pazhassi Raja collected around  1.65 crore from first day over the all releasing centres. The film had a record opening, collecting  7.65 crore in its first week, which was the highest ever first week recorded for a film in Kerala, at the time it was released. The film collected ₹ 31 lakhs in its first week in Chennai box office. In 2 months, the film grossed ₹18 crores. The film collected a revenue of about ₹32 crore after its theatrical run. The film ran for 150 days in 5 theatres in Kerala and grossed ₹49 crore in total as revenue and business.

Accolades

References

External links
 

2009 films
2000s action drama films
2000s biographical drama films
2000s Malayalam-language films
Kalarippayattu films
Indian biographical drama films
Films with screenplays by M. T. Vasudevan Nair
Films directed by Hariharan
Films set in the British Raj
Films set in 1796
Films set in the 1800s
History of India on film
Films scored by Ilaiyaraaja
Indian action drama films
Indian epic films
Indian historical drama films
Biographical action films
Indian historical action films
History of Kerala on film
Films shot in Kerala
Films shot in Kannur
Films shot in Thalassery
Films shot in Kozhikode
Films shot in Palakkad
Films that won the Best Audiography National Film Award
Best Malayalam Feature Film National Film Award winners
2009 drama films